The administrative divisions and subdivisions of Gwangju are:

List of districts
 Buk-gu
 Dongnim-dong
 Duam-1-dong
 Duam-2-dong
 Duam-3-dong
 Geon-guk-dong
 Ilgok-dong
 Im-dong
 Jung-ang-dong
 Jungheung-1-dong
 Jungheung-2-dong
 Jungheung-3-dong
 Maegok-dong
 Munheung-1-dong
 Munheung-2-dong
 Munhwa-dong
 Ochi-1-dong
 Ochi-2-dong
 Punghyang-dong
 Samgak-dong
 Seokgok-dong
 Sin-an-dong
 Un-am-1-donģ
 Un-am-2-dong
 Un-am-3-dong
 Usan-dong
 Yongbong-dong
 Dong-gu
 Gwangsan-gu
 Nam-gu
 Baekun-dong
 Bangrim-dong
 Bongseon-dong
 Chilseok-dong
 Chon-dong
 Daeji-dong
 Deoknam-dong
 Dogeum-dong
 Gu-dong
 Guso-dong
 Haengam-dong
 Hwajang-dong
 Ijang-dong
 Imam-dong
 Jinwol-dong
 Jiseok-dong
 Juwol-dong
 Nodae-dong
 Sa-dong
 Seo-dong
 Sinjang-dong
 Songha-dong
 Wolsan-dong
 Wolseong-dong
 Wonsan-dong
 Yangchon-dong
 Yanggwa-dong
 Yangrim-dong 
 Seo-gu
 Byeokjin-dong
 Chipyeong-dong
 Deokhong-dong
 Geumho-dong
 Gwangcheon-dong
 Hwajeong-dong
 Maewol-dong
 Mareuk-dong
 Naebang-dong
 Nongseong-dong
 Pongam-dong
 Seha-dong
 Seochang-dong
 Ssangchon-dong
 Yang-dong
 Yongdu-dong
 Yuchon-dong

See also 
 Administrative divisions of South Korea
 Geography of South Korea

 
Gwangju